Teviornis is a genus of extinct birds. One species has been described, T. gobiensis. It lived in the Maastrichtian stage at the end of the Late Cretaceous period, some 70 million years ago. It is known from fossils collected from the Nemegt Formation of Gobi, south Mongolia.

The fossils include only the holotype which are pieces of a crushed right forelimb. These pieces include a nearly complete right carpometacarpus, two phalanges, the radiale and ulnare of the wrist, and a fragment of the distal right humerus. The catalog number of these fossils are given multiple times as PIN 4499-1, but they are listed as PIN 44991-1 on page 3, where the holotype is formally listed. This is probably a misprint.

The fossils were collected at the Gurilyn tsav locality, northwest corner of Umnogobi Aimak, Mongolia. They are in the collection

The genus name Teviornis is the Greek masculine word for bird combined with the name of Victor Tereschenko, the Paleontologist at the PIN who discovered the specimen. Gobiensis refers to the harsh Gobi Desert in which the fossil was found. The fossils are in the collection of the Paleontological Institute, Russian Academy of Sciences, Moscow.

Teviornis was described by Kurochkin, et al. as a member of the Presbyornithidae. These were stilt-legged, Anseriform, waterfowl which are extinct, but which flourished during the Late Cretaceous and Paleogene. If Teviornis does belong to the Presbyornithidae then, together with  Vegavis from Antarctica,  there is evidence that relatives of today's waterfowl already were widespread and highly apomorphic by the end of the Mesozoic.

A review of Kurochkin et al. was performed by Clarke and Norell in 2004. They concluded that some of the characters used by Kurochkin et al. to assign T. gobiensis to the Anseriformes, such as an unbowed metacarpal III, are plesiomorphies which are primitive for Avialae and also retained in some members of Ornithurae. They found that the remaining characters used by Kurochkin et al. also had wider distribution than was assumed, or had an incompletely studied distribution. Moreover, Clarke et al. found no synapomorphies of Aves (sensu Gauthier), Neognathae, or Galloanseres, preserved in PIN 4499-1. thus, they conclude, Teviornis cannot be assigned with any confidence to the Presbyornithidae.

References

External links
 palaeos.com: 360.650 Galloanserae: Anseres: Anatoidea: Teviornis. Drawings of type carpometacarpus and humerus. Version of 2004-JUL-13. Retrieved 2007-NOV-08.

Fossil taxa described in 2002
Late Cretaceous birds of Asia
Nemegt fauna
Presbyornithidae